Daniel Leonard James Poulter (born 30 October 1978) is a British Conservative Party politician, who was elected at the 2010 general election as the Member of Parliament (MP) for Central Suffolk and North Ipswich. Poulter is a psychiatrist and served as a Parliamentary Under-Secretary of State in the Department of Health between September 2012 and May 2015 when he returned to the backbenches.

Early life and career
Poulter was born in Beckenham in Kent. He was privately educated at Vinehall School and Battle Abbey School before attending the University of Bristol, graduating with a law degree, before qualifying as a medical doctor at King's College London (MBBS; AKC).

Poulter worked as a junior doctor training in obstetrics and gynaecological medicine and has published articles in the area of women's health. During the 2011 parliamentary summer recesses, Poulter worked at the James Paget University Hospital in Gorleston, in the Accident and Emergency department. At the time of meeting David Cameron in 2006, who inspired him to enter politics, he was working in Mental Health.  In 2018, Poulter became a Member of the Royal College of Psychiatrists and continues to work as an NHS mental health Doctor 

Poulter was elected as a Conservative member of Hastings Borough Council in 2006, serving until 2007. He was the deputy leader of Reigate and Banstead Council between 2008 and 2010.

In June 2021, Poulter became a non-executive director for Kanabo Group PLC, a pharmaceutical company based in London.

Parliamentary career
Poulter was elected as the Member of Parliament for Central Suffolk and North Ipswich at the 2010 general election, receiving 27,125 votes, increasing the Conservative majority of his predecessor, Michael Lord, seeing a vote share of 50.8%.

In 2011, he was credited with a "lifesaving" intervention in Parliament when he persuaded fellow Conservative MP Guy Opperman to seek urgent medical treatment. Opperman subsequently had a brain tumour removed.

Poulter announced he would resign from the British Medical Association in 2012, following an announced doctors' strike. He said he did not believe "striking as a doctor could ever be justified".

In September 2012, Poulter became the Parliamentary Under Secretary of State at the Department of Health. His primary responsibilities as a Health Minister were for workforce issues, NHS estates and IT systems. After the 2015 general election, Poulter returned to the back benches, and to working part-time as a doctor.

In October 2015, Poulter expressed his support for protests by doctors and others against the Conservative government's proposed changes to the junior doctors' contract. In April 2016, Poulter widened his criticism of the Conservative government, in a Guardian article.

Poulter was opposed to Brexit prior to the 2016 EU membership referendum. He later voted along party lines concerning leaving the EU.

In his local constituency he is on record as being opposed to the building of a bypass around the North of Ipswich. 

In an article penned by Poulter for the East Anglian Daily Times, he said 'studies of healthy omnivores eating a diet rich in plant foods have failed to find consistent evidence that red meat is unhealthy'.

In December 2022, he wrote an article in The Guardian advocating for increasing nurses' pay during the 2022 National Health Service strikes.

Sunday Times libel case
In November 2017, the Sunday Times published two articles based on claims made to the newspaper by the MP Andrew Bridgen that Poulter had sexually assaulted three female MPs eight years previously. The Conservative Party Panel investigated the matter and exonerated Poulter, confirming that no woman had ever made a complaint about him. It dismissed the claims as having "no reliable evidence" to support them.
 
In February 2019, the Sunday Times apologised in open court to  Poulter, acknowledging that the allegations were false, defamatory and should not have been published. The articles were removed from the newspaper's website and Times Newspapers Limited agreed that it would not republish the same or similar allegations about Poulter in the future.  The Sunday Times paid substantial damages to him, as well as his legal costs.

References

External links 
 Official website
 Daniel Poulter MP Conservative Party profile
 Central Suffolk and North Ipswich Conservatives
 

1978 births
Living people
Alumni of the University of Bristol
Alumni of King's College London
Associates of King's College London
Conservative Party (UK) MPs for English constituencies
UK MPs 2010–2015
UK MPs 2015–2017
UK MPs 2017–2019
UK MPs 2019–present
Councillors in East Sussex
Councillors in Surrey
People from Beckenham